The 1967–68 Washington State Cougars men's basketball team represented Washington State University for the 1967–68 NCAA college basketball season. Led by tenth-year head coach Marv Harshman, the Cougars were members of the Athletic Association of Western Universities (AAWU, Pac-8) and played their home games on campus at Bohler Gymnasium in Pullman, Washington.

References

External links
Sports Reference – Washington State Cougars: 1967–68 basketball season

Washington State Cougars men's basketball seasons
Washington State Cougars
Washington State
Washington State